Shahrak-e Bakhtiar Dasht (also Romanized as Shahrak-e Bakhtīār Dasht) is a village in Mahmudabad Rural District, in the Central District of Isfahan County, Isfahan Province, Iran. At the 2006 census, its population was 327, in 90 families.

References 

Populated places in Isfahan County